is a Japanese manga series written by Matsuri Hino. It was serialized in Hakusensha's shōjo manga magazine LaLa from 2004 to 2013, with its chapters collected in nineteen tankōbon volumes. The manga series is licensed in English by Viz Media, who has released all nineteen volumes. The English adaptation premiered in the July 2006 issue of Viz's Shojo Beat magazine, with the collected volumes being published on a quarterly basis.

Two drama CDs were created for the series, as well as a twenty-six episode anime adaptation based on the first two sagas. Produced by Studio Deen, the anime series' first season aired in Japan on TV Tokyo between April and July 2008. The second season, aired on the same station from October to December 2008. The anime uses many of the same voice actors as were used for the drama CDs. The anime adaptation was licensed for release in North America by Viz Media.

Plot

Yuki's earliest memory is of a stormy night in winter, where she was attacked by a rogue vampire and rescued by Kaname Kuran, a Pureblood vampire. Ten years later, Yuki is the adopted daughter of the headmaster of Cross Academy, Kaien Cross, and has become a guardian of the vampire race, protecting her childhood crush, Kaname, from discovery as he leads a group of vampires at the elite boarding school. 

At her side is Zero Kiryu, a childhood friend whose hatred for the creatures that destroyed everything he held dear leaves him determined never to trust them. This coexisting arrangement seems all well and good, but have the vampires truly renounced their murderous ways, or is there a darker truth behind their actions? In this world of secrets, nothing is as it seems. The price of misplaced trust may even be worse than death. Should Yuki truly find out what was in her past, is the truth going to hurt her worse than not knowing?

Media

Manga
Written and illustrated by Matsuri Hino, Vampire Knight was serialized in Hakusensha's shōjo manga magazine LaLa from November 24, 2005, to May 24, 2013. The individual chapters were collected and published in nineteen tankōbon volumes, released from July 10, 2005, to November 5, 2013.

The series was licensed for English release in North America by Viz Media. In addition to publishing the individual volumes, the series was serialized in Viz's Shojo Beat manga anthology from the July 2006 issue until the magazine was discontinued after the August 2009 issue. It is licensed for English release in Australia and New Zealand by Madman Entertainment, which released fifteen volumes. The final volume was released in English on October 14, 2014 by Viz Media.

Sequel
Since the manga's conclusion, Hino began releasing a series of special chapters, which take place after the end of the final volume. On November 8, 2013, Hino released the first special chapter titled  in LaLa Fantasy, which was licensed and released digitally by Viz Media on December 9, 2014. Following chapters were released in LaLa DX. The second special chapter, titled , was released on February 10, 2015. On December 10, 2015, the third special chapter, titled , was released. On February 10, 2016, the fourth and final special chapter, was released. The chapters were collected as the first volume of a sequel manga Vampire Knight: Memories, released on June 3, 2016. Vampire Knight: Memories itself officially launched in LaLa DX on June 10, 2016. Eight volumes have been published as of August 2022.

Anime

Vampire Knight was adapted into a thirteen episode anime television series by Studio Deen, which was broadcast on TV Tokyo from April 8 to July 1, 2008. A second thirteen-episode season, Vampire Knight Guilty, was broadcast from October 7 to December 30, 2008.

The series uses four pieces of theme music. Kanon Wakeshima performs the first season ending theme, "Still Doll", and also the second season's ending theme . The soundtrack is composed by Takefumi Haketa and consists of 30 tracks (including the opening theme and ending theme).

In North America, the series was licensed by Viz Media. In the UK, the first volume was officially released on DVD via Manga Entertainment on November 22, 2010. In Australia, ABC3 aired the series in 2011.

Vampire Knight was made available for streaming on Hulu, Netflix, and Crunchyroll.

Light novels
Three light novels created by Matsuri Hino and Ayuna Fujisaki were published in Japan by Hakusensha in 2008 (the first two novels) and 2013 (the third), respectively. The novels feature side-stories that use the characters of the manga, but are not specifically based on chapters from the series. The first novel, was published on April 5, 2008. The first story within the novel looks at an incident that occurred at Cross Academy in the year preceding Yuki's arrival about a Day Class student named Fuka Kisaragi, while the second story details an incident that occurred while Zero was still in training to be a vampire hunter alongside Kaito Takamiya, another boy training under Toga Yagari to be a vampire hunter.

The second novel, was published on October 3, 2008. The story focuses on two minor characters, Nadeshiko Shindo and Kasumi Kageyama, from the manga, following their respective unrequited love at Cross Academy, as well as detailing a case that happened when Akatsuki Kain and Ruka Souen go to visit Senri Shiki and Rima Toya's modeling studio.

The third novel, was released in 2014, featuring side-stories about Rido Kuran, Sara Shirabuki, and Yuki's and Zero's activities during the timeskip. The third novel is the only novel thus far to have been licensed by Viz Media and released in North America.

Other media
Two drama CDs have been released for Vampire Knight. The first, LaLa Kirameki, was released as an extra with the September 2005 issue of LaLa. The second, Vampire Knight Midnight CD-Pack, was released only via mail order.

 is a Japanese dating simulator based on Vampire Knight that was released by D3 Publisher in Japan in January 2009.

In November 2008, the official Vampire Knight, titled , was published in Japan. In addition to providing additional information about the series characters and story, it includes images and details from Hino's storyboard. The fanbook has been licensed by Viz Media and was released on October 19, 2010.

A 94-page Matsuri Hino Illustrations Vampire Knight was released on July 5, 2010, the artwork included one original double page spread created for the Artbook and a compilation of 100 previously released Vampire Knight color artworks.

A live-action musical adaptation was announced and staged at the Hakuhinkan Theater in Tokyo from January 21 to the 25th, 2015. Another musical took place July 1 to the 5th, 2015.

Notes

References

External links

Official Viz Vampire Knight website

2004 manga
2008 Japanese television series endings
Anime series based on manga
Aniplex
Dark fantasy anime and manga
Fictional vampire hunters
Hakusensha manga
Hakusensha franchises
Incest in anime and manga
School life in anime and manga
Shōjo manga
Studio Deen
Supernatural anime and manga
Television shows written by Mari Okada
TV Tokyo original programming
Vampires in anime and manga
Viz Media anime
Viz Media manga
Viz Media novels